Marshall T. Savage is an entrepreneur, business executive, energy innovator and futurist from Rifle, Colorado.

Marshall Thomas Savage, is an advocate of space travel who wrote The Millennial Project: Colonizing the Galaxy in Eight Easy Steps and founded the First Millennial Foundation, which was designed to make plans for stellar exploration over the next 1,000 years.

Early life
Savage was born on 6 August 1955, Grand Valley, Colorado. His parents are John Savage Sr. and Joan Leonhardt and he is the third of four sons. The Savage family continues to be very active in the development of natural gas, real estate, water, timber, and wind power in Colorado.

In 1963, John and Joan Savage moved their family of four sons to Graham Mesa in Rifle, Colorado.

During the 1968 to 1969 year, his parents took him and his siblings out of school for a trip to Europe.

For me, I think the key moment in the whole idea of Man in space came with the first orbital fly by of the Moon. Somehow that impressed me more even than the Moon landing, because it was the idea that these are the first guys who went into outer space. They left the Earth. They weren’t just flying in orbit. They were out there in deep space. My family and I had taken a year off and we were traveling around Europe in a Volkswagen van. I think we were the first yuppie hippy family in history. And we were on the island of Rhodes, Christmas Eve 1968. Terrible weather. Rain pelting down, absolutely black outside. And we’re all jammed up in our own little life support capsule there, and we’re listening to the radio. These guys, these men. The first true spacemen. And their voice came disembodied from the depths of space. I didn’t grow up with a religious background, but when they started reading from the book of Genesis, and [I was] listening to these guys on Christmas Eve out there in the depths for the first time. It just touched me at a vital chord that said: this is the future; and not just the future of mankind but [my] personal future. [I felt] these guys [were] talking to [me].
— Savage, telling his story on the documentary Space Colonies in 1999.

Savage attended Rifle High, likely from Fall 1969 to Spring 1973.

He took a gap year from Fall 1973 to Spring 1974.

At some point during the Spokane, Washington World's Fair, 4 May to 3 November 1974, Savage "and his buddies" drove up to the region. He never forgot its beauty, as 23 years later he would move his young family there permanently to live nearby, in Idaho, in late 1997.

After high school, Savage's original ambition was to become an astronaut. He was accepted for Air Force Reserve Officer Training Corps (ROTC) at University of Colorado at Boulder (CU Boulder). However, when it became clear that Spiro Agnew's plan for a post-Apollo space program was not going to happen, he declined to continue.

Savage instead opted to follow his other interest, literature, and attend Swarthmore College, which he attended for one full year (two semesters) from Fall 1974 to Spring 1975.

In early 1975 Gerard K. O'Neill came to Swarthmore to deliver a speech on space colonies. This re-ignited Savage's interest in space. Savage attended a conference, likely the 7–9 May 1975 Space Manufacturing conference, in Princeton put on by Dr. O'Neill.

He then took a break from school for three years, missing the 1975-6, 1976-7, and 1977-8 school years.

Savage, April 1978, working for the California Museum of Science and Industry
While taking a break from his studies, on 20 April 1978, he was featured in the Yuma Daily Sun while working for the California Museum of Science and Industry's travelling team. His team visited elementary schools, in this case San Pasqual School of Yuma, Arizona. The exhibits gave students "firsthand experiences with recent events in the fields of mathematics, the human body, electricity, minerals, science, space exploration, and energy."

Savage took two further semesters at Swarthmore, in Fall 1978 and Fall 1979.

Perhaps inspired from his experience with the California Museum of Science and Industry, he attended the University of Southern California (USC), taking a variety of classes, including film studies and television production, ultimately completing his English degree there and graduating in 1981.

After graduation
After graduating from USC, aged 26, he returned to Rifle to participate in managing his family's business interests.

Shale Energy Corporation of America
In the mid-80s Savage also worked for a small company, Shale Energy Corporation of America (ECA) in Denver.

West Anvil Water & Power Company
One project he worked on for about five years was a campaign to build a dam on the Colorado River. He founded an entity called "West Anvil Water & Power Company". He established it with family members to develop the Webster Hill reservoir and hydropower project on the Colorado River. In 1982 this entity applied for a permit to build a dam on this river, submitting an environmental assessment and resource management plan for Glenwood Springs Resource Area, but the application was ultimately rejected by the relevant regulatory agencies. It was after this time, circa 1984, that Savage began to write what would become The Millennial Project, in his spare time.

Quality Times Audio Bookstore
Circa 1987, with his younger brother Dan, he founded a pioneering audiobook store called Quality Times Audio Bookstore, in Denver, Colorado.

"As children we were carefully taught how to read," he said in an interview on 1 April 1987 with the Denver Post. "But not many people have been taught listening skills. One thing audio books are very good at is reawakening that latent ability to understand and follow the spoken word."

More important than the difference between reading and listening, Savage said, is the difference between watching a story on television and listening to a storyteller.

"The fundamental difference between theater of the eye and theater of the mind is that when you watch TV, everything is presynthesized for you. Theater of the mind is so much more powerful by comparison. Look at what happened in 1938 when Orson Welles' 'War of the Worlds' was aired over national radio. The whole country went berserk. Get a message orally, and your mind fills in the details. Believe me, George Lucas cannot provide the props and special effects that my imagination produces spontaneously."

Tri-County Ambulance
He returned to Rifle in about 1991 to start an ambulance transfer business called Tri-County Ambulance. Marshall Savage and his brother John Savage were volunteers on the Ambulance Transfer business, but ultimately they decided to buy an ambulance, and start charging people for it. At its peak they had 2 brand-new ambulances. He handed the day-to-day management of this business over to his bride, whom he had just married, in 1993. She managed the business until 1997 when they sold it and moved to Coeur d'Alene, Idaho.

Savage Land Company
Savage was also involved as a supervisor of his eldest brother's construction business, building homes on Graham Mesa in Rifle. Savage did not want to continue in this role, however, and resolved to leave Rifle in 1997.

Writing career
- Savage published his only book, The Millennial Project, in 1992.
- In November 1997 Savage's 17,000-word feature article "Convergence with Destiny" was published in the 5th of 13 issues of the First Millennial Foundation / Living Universe Foundation's publication, Distant Star.
- As of early 1997, he was working on another book, on longevity, tentatively titled The Methuselah Project, but at some point afterwards, shelved the project.
- As of August 2018, Savage is working on an expansion of the Moon chapter from TMP into a standalone book, entitled TMP 2.0 (not to be confused with Eric Hunting's website with the same name, which Eric worked on from about 2001 to 2011).

Marriage and family
In 1993 he married Tami Savage and became step-father to her two children from a previous marriage to a man called Mr. Eichman.

 Jeffrey Michael "Jeff" Eichman (born 1983)
 Matthew "Matt" Eichman (born 1986), a chef. Currently Executive Director of the Savage Catering Group in Coeur D'Alene, Idaho.
He had two children with Tami:
 Dyson A. Savage (named after futurist Freeman Dyson), born circa December 1995. On 13 May 2018 he graduated from the University of Idaho with a double major in Economics and Finance.
 Mackensie Savage (born circa 1998). As of 24 December 2016 she works at Shopko Coeur d'Alene.

The Millennial Project
From about December 1992 to about November 1997, he was an active member of the tech futurist community, especially after the publication in 1992 of his 512-page magnum opus, The Millennial Project (TMP).

Post-FMF
In about 1998, he withdrew from active involvement in the FMF. Prompted by a desire not to work in his family's construction business in Rifle, he wished to leave this small town. He currently lives in Coeur d'Alene, Idaho.

See also
Savage Family of Rifle, Colorado
Space colonization
John S. Lewis
Gerard K. O'Neill
Robert Zubrin
K. Eric Drexler

References

Living people
Futurologists
Space advocates
Place of birth missing (living people)
1955 births